Brian M. Lucey is a professor at the Trinity Business School, Trinity College Dublin. He is editor-in-chief of the International Review of Financial Analysis and the International Review of Economics & Finance.

Lucey has published over 400 peer-reviewed articles, book chapters, commentaries, etc. which have been cited more than 19,000 times, giving him an h-index of 65.

References

External links

Year of birth missing (living people)
Academics of Trinity College Dublin
Irish economists
Living people